Poe is an unincorporated community in Nicholas County, West Virginia, United States.

The community was named for author Edgar Allan Poe.

References

Unincorporated communities in Nicholas County, West Virginia
Unincorporated communities in West Virginia